Nowata Municipal Airport  is a city-owned, public-use airport located two nautical miles (4 km) northeast of the central business district of Nowata, a city in Nowata County, Oklahoma, United States. It was included in the National Plan of Integrated Airport Systems for 2007–2011, which categorized it as a general aviation facility.

Facilities and aircraft 
Nowata Municipal Airport covers an area of 100 acres (40 ha) at an elevation of 679 feet (207 m) above mean sea level. It has one asphalt paved runway designated 17/35 which measures 2,500 by 45 feet (762 x 14 m). There is also a closed turf runway designated 5/23 which is 2,440 by 45 feet (744 x 14 m).

For the 12-month period ending May 11, 2011, the airport had 200 general aviation aircraft operations, an average of 16 per month. At that time there were seven aircraft based at this airport, all single-engine.

References

External links 
Nowata Municipal Airport (H66) at Oklahoma Aeronautics Commission
Aerial image as of February 1995 from USGS The National Map

Airports in Oklahoma
Buildings and structures in Nowata County, Oklahoma